École Marie-Gaétane is a Francophone high school in Kedgwick, New Brunswick, Canada.

External links
 EMG School Site

High schools in New Brunswick
1974 establishments in New Brunswick
Educational institutions established in 1974